Diospyros elliptifolia is a tree in the family Ebenaceae. Inflorescences bear up to three flowers. The specific epithet  is from the Latin meaning "elliptic leaves". Habitat is mixed dipterocarp forests from sea-level to  altitude. D. elliptifolia is found in Sumatra, Borneo and the Philippines.

References

elliptifolia
Plants described in 1926
Trees of Sumatra
Trees of Borneo
Trees of the Philippines